Vestoppland Prison is a prison in the county of Innlandet, Norway. It consists of two correctional facilities, located in Gjøvik and Valdres. The facility in Valdres is a lower security prison, while the facility in Gjøvik  has a higher security level.

References 

Buildings and structures in Oppland
Prisons in Norway
Year of establishment missing